A constitutional referendum was held in French Dahomey and French Togoland on 21 October 1945 as part of the wider French constitutional referendum. In the two territories both questions were approved by large margins. Voter turnout was 83.5%.

Results

Question I

Question II

References

1945 referendums
October 1945 events in Africa
1945
1945 in French Dahomey
1945
1945 in French Togoland
1945